A gōshi gaisha  is a type of "unlimited liability" incorporation under the Companies Act of Japan, but its structure is similar to that of a limited partnership.

Structure
In a gōshi gaisha, partners are divided into two categories: (1) a general partner who has unlimited liability similar to a partner in a general partnership and (2) a limited partner who has limited liability only up to the amount he has invested in the partnership (limited partner). All partners are still directly liable to creditors of the partnership, and thus partners can still be sued individually (direct liability).

References

Japanese business law
Types of business entity